Ccoyo is a populated place in Cusco Region, Peru.

See also
Acomayo
Antabamba
Chuquibambilla
Paruro
Raqchi
Tambobamba

References

Populated places in the Cusco Region